Iftiquar Uddin Talukder Pintu (ইফতিকার উদ্দিন তালুকদার পিন্টু) is a Bangladesh Awami League politician and the incumbent Member of Parliament from Netrokona-3.

Early life
Pintu was born on 10 November 1964.

Career
Pintu was elected to Parliament from Netrokona-3 on 5 January 2014 as a Bangladesh Awami League candidate.

References

1964 births
Living people
People from Netrokona District
Awami League politicians
10th Jatiya Sangsad members